Lauren Henderson (born November 5, 1986 in Marblehead, Massachusetts) is an American jazz singer based in New York and Miami. She has released nine albums and one EP through her label Brontosaurus Records.

Early life
As a child, Henderson sang in both church and school choirs. She attended Wheaton College, where she studied Music and Hispanic Studies. She later earned an Executive Master of Business Administration degree from Brown University and the IE Business School in Spain. Henderson speaks English and Spanish. She also studied abroad in Mexico and Spain, studying traditional music and flamenco singing and dance. She later moved to New York and studied with Paquito D'Rivera, Barry Harris, and Jane Monheit. Henderson releases music through her own label, Brontosaurus Records.

Career
In 2011, she released her self-titled debut album. Her second album, A La Madrugada, which she produced and arranged, was released in 2015. It peaked at 90 on the JazzWeek charts. The song "Accede" from the album appeared in the film The Drowning. In March 2018, she released the album Ármame, which charted in the JazzWeek Top 40. In October 2018, Henderson released the EP Riptide. She released the album Alma Oscura in June 2019. The album debuted at #25 on the JazzWeek chart for the week of July 29, 2019. Henderson's song "El Ritmo" was featured in El Juego de Las Llaves. Two songs by Hendeson were featured in a production of the play Romeo y Julieta, "Alma Oscura" and "Ven Muerte". Her 2020 album, The Songbook Session, placed in the JazzWeek charts Top 5, and Top 50 year end chart. She also released a holiday album that year titled Classic Christmas. Henderson's album Musa was released on June 11, 2021.

Discography

Studio albums

Extended plays

References

External links
 Official website

Living people
1986 births
Latin jazz musicians
American women jazz singers
American jazz singers
21st-century American women singers
21st-century American singers
People from Marblehead, Massachusetts
Singers from Massachusetts
Jazz musicians from Massachusetts
Wheaton College (Massachusetts) alumni